Lieutenant-General John Campbell, 1st Marquess of Breadalbane FRS (30 March 1762 – 29 March 1834), known as John Campbell until 1782 and as The Earl of Breadalbane and Holland between 1782 and 1831, was a Scottish soldier and landowner.

Background and education
Campbell was the son of Colin Campbell of Carwhin by Elizabeth Campbell, daughter of Archibald Campbell, of Stonefield. He was a great-grandson of Colin Campbell of Mochaster, younger son of Sir Robert Campbell, 3rd Baronet, of Glenorchy, and uncle of John Campbell, 1st Earl of Breadalbane and Holland. He was educated at Winchester.

Career
In January, 1782, at age 19, Campbell succeeded his kinsman in the earldom of Breadalbane and Holland. This was a Scottish peerage and did not entitle him to an automatic seat in the House of Lords. However, in 1784 he was elected as one of the sixteen Scottish Representative Peers to sit in the House of Lords. The same year he was appointed a Fellow of the Royal Society.

Lord Breadalbane and Holland raised the Breadalbane Fencibles Regiment, in which he served as a lieutenant-colonel. He became colonel in 1802, a major-general in 1809 and a lieutenant-general in 1814. In 1806 he was created Baron Breadalbane, of Taymouth Castle in the County of Perth, in the Peerage of the United Kingdom, which entitled him to an automatic seat in the House of Lords. In 1831 he was further honoured when he was made Earl of Ormelie and Marquess of Breadalbane in the Peerage of the United Kingdom.

Family
Lord Breadalbane married Mary Gavin, daughter of David Gavin, of Langton House, Berwickshire, in 1793. They had one son and two daughters. One daughter, Lady Mary Campbell, married Richard Temple-Grenville, 2nd Duke of Buckingham and Chandos. He died at Taymouth Castle, Perthshire, in March 1834, aged 71, and was succeeded by his only son, John, Earl of Ormelie. The Marchioness of Breadalbane died in September 1845.

Notes

References
 Endnote:

External links

|-

1762 births
1834 deaths
Fellows of the Royal Society
British Fencibles officers
People educated at Winchester College
Scottish representative peers
British Army lieutenant generals
18th-century Scottish landowners
John
19th-century Scottish landowners
Peers of the United Kingdom created by William IV